Maria Wagner  is an American television soap opera director and writer.

Directing credits
As the World Turns
 Director (1984–2010)
Breakdown Writer (January 2008 – March 2008)

Awards and nominations
Daytime Emmy Award
Win, 2007 & 1993, Directing, As the World Turns
Nomination, 1985–1990, 1992, 1995, 2001–2003, Directing, As the World Turns

External links

1949 births
American soap opera writers
American television directors
American women television directors
Living people
Place of birth missing (living people)
American women television writers
Women soap opera writers
21st-century American women